Stockholm Olympic Stadium, most often called Stockholms stadion or (especially locally) simply Stadion, is a stadium in Stockholm, Sweden. Designed by architect Torben Grut, it was opened in 1912; its original use was as a venue for the 1912 Olympic Games. At the 1912 Games, it hosted athletics, some equestrian and football matches, gymnastics, the running part of the modern pentathlon, tug of war, and wrestling events. It has a capacity of 13,145–14,500 depending on usage and a capacity of nearly 33,000 for concerts.

Overview
The Stadium was the home ground for association football team Djurgårdens IF for many decades, until the more modern Tele2 Arena was inaugurated in 2013. Djurgårdens IF still has offices in the Stadium building.

In 1956, when Melbourne hosted the Olympics, the equestrian competitions were held here due to quarantine rules in Australia. In 1958 the stadium was the venue of the European Athletics Championships. Finland-Sweden athletics international has been held here 29 times. The annual Stockholm Marathon finishes with a three quarter lap around the tracks of the stadium. Since 1967 the stadium has been the venue of the annual international athletics meeting DN Galan, from 2011 part of Diamond League. Originally, the north-east stand had two levels, increasing the capacity to about 20,000. After the Olympics, it was reduced to one level.

The Metro station Stadion was opened in 1973.

Some sections of the stadium were damaged by a bomb attack on 8 August 1997. Mats Hinze, who  was against Stockholm's bid for the 2004 Summer Olympics, was later found guilty.

Other events
Since then, it has hosted numerous sports events, notably football and track and field athletics, but also for example, 50 Swedish Championship finals in bandy and hosted concerts.

In 1985, Bethany College head coach and future College Football Hall of Fame member Ted Kessinger brought the first American football team to play in Sweden.  The Bethany "Terrible Swedes" defeated the Swedish all-star team 72–7.

In 2001, 2002 and 2004 the venue hosted the Speedway Grand Prix of Sweden.

Records
It is one of the smallest athletics stadiums ever used in a Summer Olympic Games.

Stockholm's stadium has seen more athletics world records broken than any other stadium in the world, with a total of 83 as of 2008.

The record attendance, for football, is 21,995 and was set on 16 August 1946, when Djurgårdens IF played AIK. The record attendance, for bandy, is 28,848 and was set in 1959.

In 1995, The Rolling Stones performed at the stadium in front of 35,200 people.

Kiss sold out the stadium, by selling all 32,500 tickets in less than 20 minutes, during their 2008 World Tour. Kiss also played 2 nights at this stadium during their 1996–97 reunion tour Alive/Worldwide.

Michael Jackson performed on stage twice on July 17–18, 1992, during Dangerous World Tour. Each show had 53.000 viewers. In total 106.000 viewers.

Bruce Springsteen has performed at the stadium no less than eight times. Twice in 1988, once 1993, twice in 1999 and again in 2009 playing three sold-out shows to approximately 100.000 people.

AC/DC performed at the stadium on 3 June 2010 in front of 32,768 people

Gallery

See also
DN Galan
Speedway Grand Prix of Sweden

References

External links

Venues of the 1912 Summer Olympics
Venues of the 1956 Summer Olympics
Olympic athletics venues
Olympic equestrian venues
Olympic football venues
Olympic gymnastics venues
Olympic modern pentathlon venues
Olympic wrestling venues
Athletics (track and field) venues in Sweden
Sports venues in Stockholm
Sports venues completed in 1912
Football venues in Sweden
Bandy venues in Sweden
Olympic stadiums
Speedway venues in Sweden
Football venues in Stockholm
Bandy World Championships stadiums
1912 establishments in Sweden
Swedish Bandy Final venues
Olympic
Diamond League venues